Nossa Senhora do Livramento is a freguesia (civil parish) of Cape Verde. It covers the northern part of the municipality of Ribeira Grande, on the island of Santo Antão.

Settlements

The freguesia consists of the following settlements (population at the 2010 census):
 Fontainhas  (pop: 282)
 Ponta do Sol (pop: 2,143, city)

References

Ribeira Grande Municipality
Parishes of Cape Verde